Tun Abdul Razak National Secondary School is a public secondary school located on the outskirts of Kuching, the capital of the East Malaysian state of Sarawak. It is national secondary school, a government school in which Malay is the main medium of instruction.

Name 
The school is initially named as Dragon Secondary School and is believed to have been derived from the hills that surround the school which resemble the coils of a dragon's body. The name is often falsely attributed to the winding road that leads to the school.

History
Tun Abdul Razak National Secondary School was established in 1959 as Dragon Secondary School as part of the Colombo Plan and it was initially administered by the Australian government. From 1967 onwards, the Malaysian Ministry of Education took over the oversight. Sixth form was introduced and it was initially taught by the Volunteer Service Overseas personnel from England, Australia and New Zealand.

List of Principals
1959-1963 : Mr. T.A.W. Downing 
1964-1967 : Mr. J.A. Bunday
1968-1969 : Mr. Chai Kui Ho 
1970 : Mr. Hii Ching Chiong 
1971-1977 : Mr. Jacob Chacko 
1978-1982 : Mr. Paul Ngui Sui Lin 
1982(1 term) : Mr. Bolhan Tahir 
1983-1987 : Mr. Oliver Katie Dobby 
1988-2004 : Mr. Gendin Wood 
2005–present : Dr. Linton @ Jerah Britten

Achievement 
 Winner of 2014 National Petrosains Science Competition 
 Winner of 2016 National Petrosains Science Competition

See also
 List of schools in Malaysia

References

National secondary schools in Malaysia
Secondary schools in Sarawak
1959 establishments in Sarawak